Danel Jordan Dongmo (born 31 January 2001) is a Cameroonian professional footballer who plays as a midfielder for Troyes.

Career
A youth product of the Cameroonian football academy, Ecole de Football des Brasseries du Cameroun, Dongmo moved to the youth side of Troyes in 2018 and their reserves in 2020. On 22 June 2022, he signed a professional contract with Troyes until 2024. He made his professional debut with Troyes as a late substitute in a 2–0 Coupe de France loss to Lille on 8 January 2022.

International career
Dongmo was called up to the Cameroon U23s for a set of friendlies in October 2022.

References

External links
 
 Ligue 1 profile

2001 births
Living people
Footballers from Douala
Cameroonian footballers
ES Troyes AC players
Championnat National 3 players
Association football midfielders
Cameroonian expatriate footballers
Cameroonian expatriates in France
Expatriate footballers in France